Miquel Martí i Pol (19 March 1929 – 11 November 2003) was one of the most popular and widely-read Catalan poets of the twentieth century, publishing more than 1,500 poems.

Biography 

At the age of 14, Martí i Pol started work in the office of a textile factory. He published his first poetry when he was only 15. Based on his experience in the factory, he wrote in 1959 a collection of poems called La fàbrica (the Factory). However, they were to remain unpublished until 1970 as his family were afraid that their publication might cause him to lose his job. He worked at the factory until 1973, when at the age of 43 the multiple sclerosis he had contracted forced him to quit. 

Martí i Pol spent his whole life in the town of his birth, Roda de Ter. He was committed to the people of the town and factory and also to the social class to which they belonged. He wrote: “I want to speak of them/in speaking of people today/ I want to speak of them. Without them, I do not exist.” However, in his best-selling collection of poems (over 100,000 copies sold) entitled Estimada Marta (Dear Marta), he showed that he could also poeticize an amorous and erotic relationship between a man and woman. In his later work, he explored the recurring themes of love, desire and death.

Martí i Pol was married twice and had two children from his first marriage.

Main works 

Some of his main works are:
1954: Paraules al vent
1966: El poble
1972: La fàbrica
1972: Vint-i-set poemes en tres temps
1975: L'arrel i l'escorça
1976: El llarg viatge
1977: Amb vidres a la sang
1978: Estimada Marta
1991: Suite de Parlavà
2002: Després de tot

Translator 
Apart from writing poetry, Martí i Pol also translated over 20 books, mainly from French. Among the authors he translated are Saint-Exupéry, Simone de Beauvoir, Apollinaire, Flaubert, Barthes, Lévi-Strauss and Zola.

Politics 
Martí i Pol was an active member of the PSUC (Unified Socialist Party of Catalonia) under the last years of the Franco dictatorship. He joined in 1968 and left in 1982, following a comment by Santiago Carrillo, long-time leader of the Spanish Communist Party, that the PSUC was "too Catalan and little Spanish".

References

External links 

Martí i Pol at the AELC (Association of Writers in Catalan Language), in Catalan, English and Spanish.
Miquel Martí i Pol at lletrA, Catalan Literature Online (Open University of Catalunya) 
Pep Guardiola reads Ara mateix (Right Now) by Martí i Pol

Catalan-language poets
Premi d'Honor de les Lletres Catalanes winners
1929 births
2003 deaths
20th-century Spanish poets